The 26th Air Division (26th AD) is an inactive United States Air Force organization.  Its last assignment was with Air Defense Tactical Air Command, assigned to First Air Force, being stationed at March Air Force Base, California.  It was inactivated on 30 September 1990.

History

Was established in October 1948 by Air Defense Command (ADC) as intermediate level of command. Initially responsible for atmospheric air defense of middle Atlantic region from North Carolina to greater New York City area east of the Appalachian mountains.  Commanded Manual Direction Center (MDC) at Roslyn Air Force Station, New York (P-3) 1948–1958 directing interceptor units to aircraft identified by Aircraft Control and Warning Squadrons at radar stations in AOR.  It employed off shore naval picket ships, fixed "Texas Tower" radar sites, airborne early warning units, and a civilian Ground Observer Corps program. The latter phased down when the SAGE program was implemented.

Improved radar and communications equipment and fighter interceptors, and better techniques and methods, eventually led to the 26th Air Division becoming the first operational Semi Automatic Ground Environment SAGE Direction Center (DC-1) within Air Defense Command at McGuire Air Force Base, New Jersey. Moved to Syracuse Air Force Station New York and commanded SAGE DC-3 Direction Center and first SAGE Command Center (CC-01) beginning in 1958 and assumed operational control of the MDC at Topsham Air Force Station, Maine in August 1958 and the SAGE DC-4 at Fort Lee Air Force Station, Virginia in September 1958.

In 1961 the division assumed air defense training responsibility for Air National Guard (ANG) units within the area.  During the Cuban Missile Crisis of 1962, the division deployed fighter aircraft and part of its airborne early warning and control force to Florida.

The 26th's area of control expanded until by 1963 its boundaries extended from the Arctic to the Gulf of Mexico and well toward the center of the United States.  Expanded responsibilities in 1963 assuming command of SAGE DC-9 at Gunter Air Force Base, Alabama in July and DC-6 at Custer Air Force Station, Michigan in September and GCI stations in Newfoundland and Labrador formerly under the 64th Air Division.

In April 1966, the division was replaced by the First Air Force, and moved without personnel or equipment to Adair Air Force Station, Oregon, where it assumed responsibility for the defense of Oregon, part of California and Nevada by the inactivation of the Portland and Reno Air Defense Sectors.   Assumed additional designation of 26th NORAD Region and 26th CONAD Region after activation of the NORAD Combat Operations Center at the Cheyenne Mountain Complex, Colorado and reporting was transferred to NORAD from ADC at Ent Air Force Base in April 1966.

The division was gradually phasing down until it replaced the 27th Air Division at Luke Air Force Base, Arizona in November 1969, when in an ADCOM reorganization of atmospheric defense forces, the command became responsible for the air defense of a large area of the southwest. In October 1979, it transferred to Tactical Air Command (ADTAC) and continued to supervise atmospheric defense forces of its assigned AOR.  Assumed additional designation 26th ADCOM Region on 8 December 1978.

Began phase-down of operations with activation of new Southwest Air Defense Sector (SWADS) in July 1987.  Engaged chiefly in transfer of mission to SWADS 1987–1990.  Inactivated on 1 October 1990.

Lineage
 Established as the 26th Air Defense Division on 21 October 1948
 Activated on 16 November 1948
 Re-designated: 26th Air Division (Defense) on 20 June 1949
 Inactivated on 1 February 1952
 Organized on 1 February 1952
 Redesignated 26th Air Division (SAGE) on 8 August 1958
 Redesignated 26th Air Division on 1 April 1966
 Inactivated on 30 September 1969
 Reactivated on 18 November 1969
 Organized on 19 November 1969
 Inactivated on 30 September 1990

Assignments

 First Air Force, 16 November 1948
 Air Defense Command, 1 April 1949 (attached to Eastern Air Defense Force after 17 November 1949)
 First Air Force, 16 November 1949 (remained attached to Eastern Air Defense Force)
 Eastern Air Defense Force, 1 September 1950 – 1 February 1952

 Eastern Air Defense Force, 1 February 1952
 Air Defense Command, 1 August 1959
 Fourth Air Force, 1 April 1966 – 30 September 1969
 Tenth Air Force, 19 November 1969
 Aerospace Defense Command, 1 December 1969
 Air Defense Tactical Air Command, 1 October 1979
 First Air Force, 6 December 1985 – 30 September 1990

Stations
 Mitchel Air Force Base, New York, 16 November 1948
 Mitchel Air Force Base Sub Base #3, (later) Roslyn Air Force Station, New York, 18 April 1949
 Syracuse Air Force Station (later Hancock Field), New York, 15 August 1958
 Stewart Air Force Base, New York, 15 June 1964
 Adair Air Force Base, Oregon, 1 April 1966 – 30 September 1969
 Luke Air Force Base, Arizona 19 November 1969
 March Air Force Base, California, 31 August 1983 – 1 July 1987

Components

Air Force
 Air Forces Iceland
 Keflavik Airport, Iceland, 1 July – 4 September 1963

Sectors

 Bangor Air Defense Sector (BaADS)
 Topsham Air Force Base, Maine, 15 August 1958 – 1 April 1966
 Boston Air Defense Sector (BADS)
 Hancock Field, New York, 1 April 1966
 Detroit Air Defense Sector (DADS)
 Custer Air Force Station, Michigan, 4 September 1963 – 1 April 1966
 Goose Air Defense Sector (GADS)
 Goose AB, Labrador, 1 July 1963 – 1 April 1966

 Montgomery Air Defense Sector (MADS)
 Gunter Air Force Base, Alabama, 1 July 1963 – 1 April 1966
 New York Air Defense Sector (NYADS)
 McGuire Air Force Base, New Jersey, 8 January 1957 – 1 April 1966
 Syracuse Air Defense Sector (SYADS)
 Syracuse Air Force Station, New York, 15 August 1958 – 4 September 1963
 Washington Air Defense Sector (WADS)
 Fort Lee Air Force Station, Virginia, 1 September 1958 – 1 April 1966

Wings

 1st Fighter Wing (Air Defense)
 Hamilton Air Force Base, California, 31 December 1969 – 10 October 1970
 78th Fighter Wing (Air Defense)
 Hamilton Air Force Base, California, 1 April 1966 – 15 September 1969; 19 November – 31 December 1969
 551st Airborne Early Warning and Control Wing
 Otis Air Force Base, Massachusetts, 1 July 1959 – 1 April 1966
 4601st Support Wing (DEW)
 Paramus, New Jersey, 1 July – 1 October 1963
 4621st Air Defense Wing (SAGE)
 McGuire Air Force Base, New Jersey, 18 October 1956 – 8 January 1957

 4622d Air Defense Wing (SAGE)
 Stewart Air Force Base, New York, 18 October 1956 – 8 January 1957
 4707th Air Defense Wing
 Otis Air Force Base, Massachusetts, 1 March – 18 October 1956
 4709th Air Defense Wing
 McGuire Air Force Base, New York, 16 February 1953 – 1 September 1954
 4710th Air Defense Wing
 New Castle Air Force Base, Delaware, 16 February 1953 – 1 September 1954

Groups

 408th Fighter Group (Air Defense)
 Kingsley Field, Oregon, 1 April 1966 – 15 September 1969
 408th Fighter Group
 Oxnard Air Force Base, California, 19 November – 31 December 1969
 503d Aircraft Control and Warning Group
 Roslyn Air Force Base, New York, 1 January 1951 – 6 February 1952

 751st Air Defense Group
 Mount Laguna Air Force Station, California, 1 March 1970 – 1 January 1974
 858th Air Defense Group
 Fallon Air Force Station, Nevada, 1 March 1970 – 1 January 1974

Interceptor squadrons
 82d Fighter-Interceptor Squadron
 Travis Air Force Base, California, 1 April – 25 June 1966
 84th Fighter-Interceptor Squadron
 Hamilton Air Force Base, California, 1 October 1970 – 1 September 1973
 Castle Air Force Base, California, 1 September 1973 – 1 July 1987
 456th Fighter-Interceptor Squadron
 Castle Air Force Base, California, 1 April 1966 – 18 July 1968

Radar squadrons

 634th Radar Squadron
 Burns Air Force Station, Oregon, 1 April 1966 – 15 September 1969
 636th Radar Squadron
 Condon Air Force Station, Oregon, 1 April 1966 – 15 September 1969
 646th Aircraft Control and Warning Squadron
 Highlands Air Force Station, New Jersey, 6 February 1952 – 16 February 1953
 647th Aircraft Control and Warning Squadron
 Quantico Air Force Station, Virginia, 6 February 1952 – 16 February 1953
 648th Aircraft Control and Warning Squadron
 Benton Air Force Station, Pennsylvania, 6 February 1952 – 16 February 1953
 649th Aircraft Control and Warning Squadron
 Bedford Air Force Station, Virginia, 26 May 1953 – 1 May 1954
 658th Radar Squadron
 Winnemucca Air Force Station, Nevada, 1 April 1966 – 18 June 1968
 666th Radar Squadron
 Mill Valley Air Force Station, California, 1 April 1966 – 15 September 1969; 19 November 1969 – 30 September 1980
 670th Radar Squadron
 San Pedro Hill Air Force Station, California, 19 November 1969 – 1 April 1976
 682d Radar Squadron
 Almaden Air Force Station, California, 1 April 1966 – 15 September 1969; 19 November 1969 – 1 April 1980
 750th Radar Squadron
 Boron Air Force Station, California, 19 November 1969 – 30 June 1975
 751st Radar Squadron
 Mount Laguna Air Force Station, California, 19 November 1969 – 30 November 1981
 761st Radar Squadron
 North Bend Air Force Station, Oregon, 1 April 1966 – 15 September 1969
 770th Aircraft Control and Warning Squadron
 Palermo Air Force Station, New Jersey, 6 February 1952 – 16 February 1953

 771st Aircraft Control and Warning Squadron
 Cape Charles Air Force Station, Virginia, 6 February 1952 – 16 February 1953
 772d Aircraft Control and Warning Squadron
 Claysburg Air Force Station, Pennsylvania, 6 February 1952 – 16 February 1953
 773d Aircraft Control and Warning Squadron
 Montauk Air Force Station, New York, 6 February 1952 – 16 February 1953
 774th Radar Squadron
 Madera Air Force Station, California, 1 April – 25 June 1966
 775th Radar Squadron
 Cambria Air Force Station, California, 19 November 1969 – 30 September 1980
 776th Radar Squadron
 Point Arena Air Force Station, California, 1 April 1966 – 15 September 1969; 19 November 1969 – 30 September 1980
 777th Radar Squadron
 Klamath Air Force Station, California, 1 April 1966 – 15 September 1969
 821st Radar Squadron
 Baker Air Force Station, Oregon, 1 April 1966 – 18 June 1968
 827th Radar Squadron
 Kingsley Field, Oregon, 1 April 1966 – 15 September 1969
 858th Radar Squadron
 Fallon Air Force Station, Nevada, 1 April 1966 – 15 September 1969; 19 November 1969 – 1 March 1970
 859th Radar Squadron
 Red Bluff Air Force Station, California, 1 April 1966 – 15 September 1969; 19 November 1969 – 30 September 1970
 866th Radar Squadron
 Tonopah Air Force Station, Nevada, 1 April 1966 – 15 September 1969; 19 November 1969 – 1 July 1970

Radar evaluation squadron
 4758th Radar Evaluation Squadron (ECM)
 Griffiss Air Force Base, New York, 1 July – 20 October 1959

See also
 List of United States Air Force Aerospace Defense Command Interceptor Squadrons
 List of United States Air Force air divisions
 United States general surveillance radar stations

References

Notes

Bibliography

 
 
 
 

026
Aerospace Defense Command units
1948 establishments in New York (state)
1990 disestablishments in California